Lingxi may refer to the following towns in China:

 Lingxi, Cangnan, seat of Cangnan County, Zhejiang
 Lingxi, Yongshun, seat of Yongshun County, Hunan
 Lingxi, Cili, Cili County, Hunan